Radostín may refer to the following places in the Czech Republic:

 Radostín (Havlíčkův Brod District), village in Havlíčkův Brod District
 Radostín (Žďár nad Sázavou District), village in Žďár nad Sázavou District
 Radostín nad Oslavou, market town in Žďár nad Sázavou District